Wercklea hottensis is a species of Malvaceae endemic to the mountains of the Massif de la Hotte in South-Western Haiti.

Description
The species forms shrubs to 2.5 m tall. Stems, leaves, buds and fruit are viciously armed with prickles. Flowers are large and either red or yellow-green.

Range
Wercklea hottensis was first found in 1929, in the Central Massif de la Hotte, on morne Bonnet Carre near Saint Louis du Sud. In 1989 and 2013 it was also discovered in the Occidental Massif de la Hotte near and in Pic Macaya National Park. The persistence of the population on morne Bonnet Carre was confirmed in 2018. In 2019 a new, formerly unknown population was discovered in Grand Bois National Park, in the Western most mountains of the Occidental Massif de la Hotte.

Habitat
The species seems to prefer moist and open habitats between 1000 and 1300m above sea level. It is growing on moist ridges in elfin forest. It has also been found in moist furrows on sunny and exposed mountain sides, either alone or together with shrubs and forest fragments.

Ecology
On Morne Bonnet Carre the species is not rare and seems to persist or even spread in areas that are grazed by cattle. The red and the green flowered morph have been documented there in 2018. In the same year small birds have been observed visiting the flowers on that mountain. In Peak Macaya National Park the species is common, the red flowered morph has been documented from there. In Grand Bois National Park, the species is very rare and only a single small population, that consists of individuals with exclusively green flowers, is known from this site.

Etymology
The species has been given the specific epithet "hottensis", as it occurs in the Massif de la Hotte in Haiti.

Taxonomy

References

hottensis